The International Society for Knowledge Organization, or ISKO, is a professional association for scholars of knowledge organization, knowledge structures, classification studies, and information organization and structure.

Publications 
The Society publishes the academic journal Knowledge Organization as the official bi-monthly journal of ISKO. Founded in 1973 by Dr. Ingetraut Dahlberg, the first President of ISKO, it began publication the following year under the banner International Classification. In 1993 the title was changed to its present form. The journal publishes original research articles relating to general ordering theory, philosophical foundations of knowledge and its artifacts, theoretical bases of classification, data analysis and reduction. It also describes practical operations associated with indexing and classification. In addition to being a technical resource, the journal traces the history of knowledge organization and discusses questions of education and training in classification.

Encyclopedia of Knowledge Organization 
Since 2016, ISKO has published the Encyclopedia of Knowledge Organization (IEKO), edited by Birger Hjorland and Claudio Gnoli. This work covers the history and development of different approaches to knowledge, core concepts in the space, comparisons of different systems and processes, and examples from current practice in regional and global projects. 

The organization also holds biennial international conferences.

Chapters 
ISKO officially recognizes regional chapters in Brazil, Canada and the United States, China, France, Germany (including Austria and Switzerland), India, Italy, Maghreb (including Tunisia + Algeria + Morocco), Poland, Singapore, Spain (including Portugal), the United Kingdom, and West Africa. ISKO cooperates with international and national organizations such as UNESCO, the European Commission, the International Organization for Standardization, the International Federation of Library Associations and Institutions, the Association for Information Science and Technology, the Networked Knowledge Organization Systems/Services, and the International Information Centre for Terminology.

References

Other reading 
Dahlberg, Ingetraut (2010) International Society for Knowledge Organization (ISKO), Encyclopedia of Library and Information Sciences, Third Edition, 1: 1, 2941 — 2949.

External links
 International Society for Knowledge Organization (homepage)
  "ISKO" in ISKO Encyclopedia of Knowledge Organization
 International Society for Knowledge Organization-Brasil

International professional associations
Library science organizations
Information science
Library-related professional associations
Organizations established in 1989